Robert Curtis McElhinney (born May 23, 1983) is a Canadian former professional ice hockey goaltender. He previously played in the NHL with the Calgary Flames, Anaheim Ducks, Ottawa Senators, Phoenix Coyotes, Columbus Blue Jackets, Toronto Maple Leafs, Carolina Hurricanes and Tampa Bay Lightning. McElhinney was drafted in the sixth-round of the 2002 NHL Entry Draft by the Flames, and won back-to-back Stanley Cups with the Lightning in 2020 and 2021.

Playing career

Early years 
McElhinney played four years of university hockey for Colorado College, compiling a 62–15–8 record in that time en route to winning two Western Collegiate Hockey Association First All-Star Team selections in 2003 and 2005, as well as NCAA Second and First All-American Team selections in 2003 and 2005, respectively. He was selected 176th overall by the Calgary Flames in the 2002 NHL Entry Draft.

He made his professional debut in 2005–06 with the Omaha Ak-Sar-Ben Knights of the American Hockey League (AHL). He tied for the AHL lead in shutouts in 2006–07 while setting an Omaha team record with 44 wins. He played in the 2007 AHL All-Star game, and was named to the AHL Second All-Star Team.

McElhinney split 2007–08 between the Quad City Flames and Calgary. He made his NHL debut on October 22, 2007 against the San Jose Sharks in relief of Miikka Kiprusoff, appearing in five NHL games, finishing with a 0–2–0 record and a 2.00 goals against average. He played the entire 2008–09 NHL season with Calgary as Kiprusoff's backup and recorded his first NHL win in his 14th game of the year, the last of the regular season, in a 4–1 victory over the Edmonton Oilers on April 11, 2009.

The Flames signed McElhinney to a two-year contract prior to the 2009–10 season. He was traded to the Anaheim Ducks on March 3, 2010 in exchange for goalie Vesa Toskala.

On February 24, 2011 McElhinney was traded to the Tampa Bay Lightning for Dan Ellis. On February 28, he was claimed off waivers by the Ottawa Senators.

McElhinney signed a one-year, two-way contract with the Phoenix Coyotes on July 4, 2011.

On February 22, 2012 McElhinney was traded to the Columbus Blue Jackets (along with second round pick in the 2012 NHL Entry Draft (via Ottawa) and a conditional fifth round selection in the 2013 Draft) for Antoine Vermette.  He spent the season with Columbus' AHL affiliate Springfield Falcons and had a fine season, posting nine shutouts to lead the league and set a franchise record for both single season and career shutouts, and was again named to the AHL Second All-Star Team.

He was placed on waivers by the Columbus Blue Jackets January 8, 2017, after allowing 4 straight goals in a 5–4 loss to the New York Rangers on January 7, 2017. He posted a 2–1–2 record and a .924 save percentage in 7 games with the team in the 2016–2017 season. One day after being waived, McElhinney was claimed by the Toronto Maple Leafs, who were in need of a backup goaltender following a disappointing season by Jhonas Enroth.

Down the stretch, McElhinney went 6–7 with 1 shutout, a 2.85 GAA and a .914 save percentage. As starter Frederik Andersen went down with an injury, McElhinney received quite a few extra starts. Most importantly in the second last game of the season for the Leafs with a playoff spot on the line. In this game, McElhinney made arguably the biggest save of his career in the dying seconds on Pittsburgh Penguins captain Sidney Crosby who seemingly had a wide-open net for a one-timer goal. McElhinney slid across the crease to make a pad save and preserved the lead that eventually held up to earn the Leafs a playoff berth.

Later career and retirement
Prior to the 2018–19 season, on October 1, 2018, the Maple Leafs placed McElhinney on waivers after Garret Sparks won the backup goaltending job in the pre-season. His two-year tenure with the Maple Leafs ended as he was claimed by the Carolina Hurricanes the following day, in order to add depth after an injury to Scott Darling.  McElhinney would go on to split most of the 2018–19 season in goal with Petr Mrázek.

On May 1, 2019, McElhinney started for the Carolina Hurricanes in Game 3 of the Stanley Cup playoffs versus the New York Islanders in Round 2 making him the oldest goaltender to make his first career playoff start at 35 years and 343 days of age. On May 3, 2019, in Game 4, he helped to secure the franchise's first ever 4–0 sweep in the best-of-seven series.

On July 1, 2019, McElhinney signed a two year contract with the Tampa Bay Lightning.
He was part of the 2020 and 2021 Stanley Cup-winning teams, spending most of those seasons as the backup to Andrei Vasilevskiy. 

On September 25, 2021, McElhinney announced his retirement via Instagram.

International play
Following the Leafs first round defeat by the Boston Bruins in the 2018 Stanley Cup playoffs, McElhinney was named to Team Canada to compete at the 2018 IIHF World Championship.

Personal life
McElhinney and his wife Ashleigh have one son and one daughter. McElhinney has a younger sister, Alana, who played goaltender for the Division I Bemidji State University's women's hockey team.

Career statistics

Regular season and playoffs

International

Awards and honours

References

External links
 

1983 births
Living people
Anaheim Ducks players
Calgary Flames draft picks
Calgary Flames players
Canadian ice hockey goaltenders
Carolina Hurricanes players
Colorado College Tigers men's ice hockey players
Columbus Blue Jackets players
Sportspeople from London, Ontario
Omaha Ak-Sar-Ben Knights players
Ice hockey people from Ontario
Ottawa Senators players
Phoenix Coyotes players
Portland Pirates players
Quad City Flames players
Springfield Falcons players
Stanley Cup champions
Tampa Bay Lightning players
Toronto Maple Leafs players
AHCA Division I men's ice hockey All-Americans